Scholars at Risk (SAR) is a U.S.-based international network of academic institutions organized to support and defend the principles of academic freedom and to defend the human rights of scholars around the world. Network membership includes over 530 higher education institutions in 42 countries.

History 
Scholars at Risk was founded during a Human Rights Program in the University of Chicago in 1999 where it launched with a large conference in June 2000. It has its headquarters in the Greenwich Village campus of New York University. Rob Quinn is the executive director of Scholars at Risk.

In 2001, Scholars at Risk joined with other international education and human rights organizations to launch the Network for Education and Academic Rights (NEAR).  When NEAR disbanded SAR continued this work through its Academic Freedom Media Review, Scholars-in-Prison Project and Academic Freedom Monitoring Project.

In 2002, SAR partnered with the Institute of International Education which was then establishing IIE's Scholar Rescue Fund. The Fund provides  financial support to scholars facing grave threats so that they may escape dangerous conditions and continue their academic work in safety.

In 2003, the network headquarters relocated from the University of Chicago to the New York City campus of New York University. In 2005, SAR and partners began organizing SAR 'sections' and 'partner networks' around the world, building a global community pledged to help scholars and promote academic freedom everywhere.

From 2007 to 2010, SAR led a series of workshops to provide a safe, open forum for academics and advocates from around the world to discuss the regional dimensions of academic freedom and the challenges faced, and to develop joint responses. These led to the development of an academic freedom curriculum and in 2011 to the Academic Freedom Advocacy Team, which researched protection for academic freedom under international human rights law.

In 2012, SAR launched the Academic Freedom Monitoring Project, through which volunteer researchers document attacks on higher education in specific countries or regions which are then published in a report. The first Free to Think report was published in 2015 and since then it has been published annually.

In 2014, SAR formalized the Student Advocacy Seminar, an initiative through which faculty researchers help students develop research and advocacy skills while investigating attacks on higher education communities.

Activities 
SAR's activities are organized under three main pillars: Protection, Advocacy and Learning.

Protection 
SAR arranges for positions of sanctuary at universities and colleges in the network for intellectuals fleeing persecution and violence. Scholars are referred to the network for assessment, referrals or transition assistance.

Advocacy 
Scholars at Risk advocates on behalf of academics, writers, artists, and other intellectuals who are threatened in their home countries. SAR organizes global campaigns to support imprisoned scholars and students. It engages students in Student Advocacy Seminars and Legal Clinics to learn real-world research and advocacy skills. Adam Braver at Roger Williams University is the Coordinator of the Advocacy Seminars. In the US Student Advocacy Days are also organized. SAR also conducts research with a network of volunteer researchers for the Academic Freedom Monitoring Project.

In 2017 Scholars at Risk supported the production of We Are Syrians book that included the stories of three Syrian women's experiences in the Syria Civil War.

Academic Freedom Monitoring Project 
The monitoring project collects data on defined attacks on higher education. These are gathered by contributing researchers who report and analyze incidents, track down sources and witnesses and help to develop advocacy responses. Every year the Free to Think report is published highlighting these incidents.

Learning 
SAR organizes various activities which support learning about academic freedom, such as an Annual Global Conference, faculty/researcher workshops, SAR Speaker series, research groups, workshops on promoting higher education values. SAR has recently created a MOOC called Dangerous Questions in collaboration with the University of Oslo.

Some scholars who SAR has advocated or is advocating for 

 Abdulqadir Jalaleddin, China
 Ahmadreza Djalali, Iran
 Gokarakonda Naga Saibaba, India
 Hatoon Al-Fassi, Saudi Arabia
Ilham Tohti, China
 Khalil Al-Halwachi, Bahrain
 Sivasubramaniam Raveendranath, Sri Lanka
 Niloufar Bayani, Iran
 Nasser bin Ghaith, United Arab Emirates
 Omid Kokabee, Iran
 Patrick George Zaki, Egypt
 Rahile Dawut, China
 Tashpolat Tiyip, China
 Xiyue Wang, Iran

Structure 
In 2003, the network headquarters relocated from the University of Chicago to the New York City campus of New York University. In 2018 a European office was opened in Ireland at Maynooth University. SAR has sections in different countries which coordinate activities of SAR members in that country.

SAR Sections 
In 2005, SAR and partners began organizing SAR 'sections' and 'partner networks' around the world, building a global community pledged to help scholars and promote academic freedom everywhere. SAR sections were established in Israel (2005, now dormant), the United Kingdom (2006, with CARA), the Netherlands (2009, with UAF), Ireland (2009, with Universities Ireland), Norway (2011), Canada (2012), Switzerland (2015), Sweden (2016), Germany (2016), Finland (2017), United States (2018), Denmark (2019), Italy (2019), and Slovakia (2019), while partner networks were formed with pre-existing higher education networks in Europe, the Middle East and Africa.

Affiliations and partnerships 
Scholars at Risk maintains affiliations and partnerships with other associations and organizations with related objectives.

To date, SAR has formed the following Partner Networks:

EUA-SAR Partner Network: With 850 members across 47 countries, the European University Association is the largest and most comprehensive organisation representing universities in Europe. 17 million students are enrolled at EUA member universities. As the voice of Europe's universities, EUA supports and takes forward the interests of individual institutions and the higher education sector as a whole.

Magna Charta Observatory: In September 2015, Scholars at Risk and Magna Charta agreed to create a formal partner network including 802 universities in 85 countries.

UNICA-SAR Partner Network: UNICA is a network of 46 universities from 35 capital cities of Europe. Its role is to promote academic excellence, integration and cooperation between member universities throughout Europe. It seeks also to be a driving force in the development of the Bologna process and to facilitate the integration of universities from Central and Eastern Europe into the European Higher Education Area.

Compostela Group of Universities: Founded in 1993, the Compostela Group of Universities is an international nonprofit association that now consists of more than 60 universities in 27 countries. CGU seeks to strengthen the channels of communication between its member universities; organize events for the study and discussion of different issues related to international higher education; and promote mobility and collaboration between members as a basis for enhancing the knowledge of cultures and languages.

Communauté Université Grenoble Alpes: The Communauté Université Grenoble Alpes (COMUE) joined SAR as a partner network in January 2017. COMUE was formed in France in December 2014 and is composed of six member and four associated higher education institutions. Its mission is to create a multidisciplinary research university with a high international profile and strong local connection that creatively serves society.

swissuniversities: In 2012, universities, universities of applied sciences and universities of teacher education across Switzerland founded swissuniversities, a body dedicated to strengthening and enhancing collaboration among Swiss institutions of higher education and promoting a common voice on educational issues. swissuniversities also coordinates tasks and acts on the international level as the Swiss national rectors' conference for its 30-plus members..

Swiss Academies of Arts and Sciences: The academies engage themselves specifically for an equitable dialogue between science and society, and they advise politics and society in science-based issues that are relevant to society. They represent sciences across institutions and disciplines. Established in the scientific community, they have access to expertise and excellence and can therefore contribute specific knowledge to important political questions

Consortium for North American Higher Education Collaboration: The Consortium for North American Higher Education (CONAHEC) fosters collaboration among institutions, organizations and agencies of higher education in Canada, Mexico, the United States, and around the world. CONAHEC develops programs and educational opportunities to prepare globally knowledgeable professionals able to contribute to the region's continued success and a better world.

Academy for Research and Higher Education (ARES): As the federation of francophone universities in the Wallonie region of southern Belgium, ARES coordinates the activities of 127 higher education institutions. ARES supports the participation and development of its member institutions in their local and international collaborations by promoting the international visibility of higher education.

International Migration, Integration and Social Cohesion (IMISCOE): IMISCOE is a European network of scholars in the area of migration and integration and works on comparative research and publications which are published in the IMISCOE book series and the CMS journal.  IMISCOE has a solidarity fund and uses it to support their member institutes to host researchers under threat. To this end it has become a member of SAR.  IMISCOE contributes to the training of young researchers and their exchange throughout Europe. Also, IMISCOE plays an important role in the mutual dialogue between researchers and society (policy, politics, civil society).

European Students' Union (ESU): The European Students' Union (ESU) is the umbrella organisation of 46 National Unions of Students (NUS) from 39 countries. The aim of ESU is to represent and promote the educational, social, economic and cultural interests of students at the European level towards all relevant bodies and in particular the European Union, Bologna Follow Up Group, Council of Europe and UNESCO. Through its members, ESU represents around 15 million students in Europe.

Mexican Association for International Education (AMPEI): The Mexican Association for International Education (Asociación Mexicana para la Educación Internacional) is a non-profit membership organization which aims to strengthen the academic quality of Mexican institutions of higher education through internationalization and international cooperation.

International Association of La Salle Universities (IALU): IALU is an effective instrument to strengthen Lasallian Higher Education, promote the development of the universities in its network and encourage individual and collective response to the expectations and requests made to universities.

See also 

 Academic Freedom
 Council for At-Risk Academics
 Scholar Rescue Fund
Committee of Concerned Scientists

References

External links 
 
 
 Scholars at Risk Network schedules conference, visit by Egyptian scholar

Freedom of expression organizations
Human rights organizations based in the United States
Organizations established in 1999
Academic freedom
1999 establishments in the United States